Okan Özçelik (born 10 May 1992) is a Dutch footballer of Turkish descent who plays as a winger. He appeared in the Turkish Süper Lig for Antalyaspor and in the Dutch Eerste Divisie for RKC Waalwijk.

External links
 Player profile at TFF.org

1992 births
Living people
Footballers from Utrecht (city)
Dutch footballers
Dutch people of Turkish descent
Antalyaspor footballers
Süper Lig players
RKC Waalwijk players
Eerste Divisie players
Derde Divisie players
Association football midfielders
USV Hercules players
Dutch expatriate footballers
Dutch expatriate sportspeople in Turkey
Expatriate footballers in Turkey
FC Utrecht players